Thomas Henning (born 26 January 1984) is an Australian writer, director, producer and artist working in theatre and film. He was co-founder and co-director of the Black Lung theatre company, known also as The Black Lung Theatre and Whaling firm along with Thomas Wright. From 2009 until 2010, Thomas Henning worked on several projects with Hayloft Theatre. From 2013 until 2020, Thomas Henning has worked on several projects with TerryandTheCuz productions.

In 2013 and 2014, Thomas Henning worked at Arte Moris, free art school in Timor-Leste, in the role of artist liaison. In 2014 Thomas Henning worked as dance producer for the art festival Arte Publiku.

In 2015 Thomas Henning established the Malkriadu Cinema film collective in Timor-Leste, creating fiction film, music videos and experimental video art.

In 2020 for the AsiaTOPA festival in Melbourne, Thomas Henning co-Produced and curated Huru Hara, a multidisciplinary arts installation and performance space at the Abbotsford Convent.

Filmography

Film

Stage

Events

References 

Living people
Australian male film actors
Male actors from Melbourne
1984 births
Australian male television actors
21st-century Australian male actors